ITC Sangeet Research Academy is a Hindustani classical music academy run by the corporate house, ITC Ltd. It is located in Kolkata, India. Noted musicians associated with the academy include Ulhas Kashalkar, Falguni Mitra, Ajoy Chakrabarty, Ustad Rashid Khan, Mashkoor Ali Khan, Girija Devi, Subhra Guha. Satyajit Ray, was one of the trustees.

Annual festival
The academy organises a classical music festival, the ITC SRA Sangeet Sammelan, every year. They also organise the ITC SRA Mini Sangeet Sammelan.

References

External links
 ITC Sangeet Research Academy, Official site

Hindustani music organisations
Organizations established in 1978
Music archives
Organisations based in Kolkata
Music schools in India
1978 establishments in West Bengal